In economics, the bliss point is a quantity of consumption where any further increase would make the consumer less satisfied. It is a quantity of consumption which maximizes utility in the absence of budget constraint. In other words, it refers to the amount of consumption that would be chosen by a person so rich that money imposed no constraint on his or her decisions.

See also 
 Economic satiation
 Keynes–Ramsey rule

References 

Consumption
Consumer theory